The Postage Act 1839 (c.52) was an act of the United Kingdom of Great Britain and Ireland that came into effect on 17 August 1839 to regulate the postage rates of Great Britain until 5 October 1840 and led to several postal reforms, including the introduction of the Uniform Penny Post and the world's first postage stamps.

Background
This was the first act in the reforms of the General Post Office that took place under the auspices of Rowland Hill. Its main objective was that within a year the cost of postage should be reduced to one penny per weight instead of heretofore being charged by the number of sheets and the distance travelled. It initiated the Fourpenny Post and within 36 days led to the drop in the cost of postage from four pence to the one penny under the Uniform Penny Post. Less than six months later the world's first postage stamps, the Penny Black and Two penny blue, were issued.

Main regulations
The main changes to be instigated by the Act were to:
 Reduce the postage rate to a uniform one penny for a determined weight
 Create proportionate rates for increased weight
 Abolish the franking privilege
 Regulate official franking
 Suspend the law in respect to the London and Dublin twopenny posts and any other penny post
 The use of the word Letter or Letters in the Act shall include newspapers, any other packet, paper, article or thing transmitted by the post but not to deprive newspapers of any current privilege
Enact the changes until 5 October 1840

Enactment

While the Act received the Royal assent on 17 August 1839, the Treasury warrant to initiate the Fourpenny Post from 5 December was made on 22 November 1839 and set forth the postage rate of four-pence as the postage rate applied as follows:

 1 postage rate up to a half-ounce letter
 2 postage rates over half-ounce but not exceeding 1 oz.
 4 postage rates over 1 oz. but not exceeding 2 oz.
 6 postage rates over 2 oz. but not exceeding 4 oz.
 8 postage rates over 4 oz. but not exceeding 8 oz.
 2 postage rates for each additional 1 oz. over 8 oz.
 Every fraction of an ounce over 4 oz. to be charged as an additional 1 oz.
 Generally no letter weighing over 16 oz. to be forwarded by the General Post Office

On 27 December 1839 a new warrant was issued that further reduced the rate to one-penny per postage rate with the weight steps as previously listed. Several other alterations were made including the abolition of all the additional Irish Sea crossing related fees and the half-penny tax on letter conveyed by mail carriages with more than 2 wheels in Scotland.

See also
 List of Acts of the Parliament of the United Kingdom, 1820–1839

References

External links
The statute

1830s in the United Kingdom
United Kingdom Acts of Parliament 1839